Jenniina Nylund (born 18 June 1999) is a Finnish ice hockey centre and member of the Finnish national ice hockey team, currently serving as captain of the St. Cloud State Huskies women's ice hockey program in the Western Collegiate Hockey Association (WCHA) conference of the NCAA Division I.

Playing career 
At four years of age, Nylund followed in the footsteps of her three older brothers and began playing ice hockey with the minor department of Jeppis Hockey, an ice hockey club in her hometown of Jakobstad on the coast of Ostrobothnia. She joined the women's under-16 (U16) team of Kokkolan Hermes, a club in Kokkola (approx.  northeast of Jakobstad), in her early teens and played on both the Hermes women's U16 team and the Jeppis men's U16 team during the 2014–15 season.

Ahead of the 2015–16 season, Nylund moved  from home to Kuortane to attend the Kuortaneen urheilulukio ('Kuortane Sports Lukio') and join the school's team in the Naisten SM-sarja, the top-tier women's ice hockey league in Finland (renamed Naisten Liiga in 2017). On Team Kuortane, she played alongside several future national team teammates, including Petra Nieminen, Viivi Vainikka, Sini Karjalainen, and Anni Keisala. Nylund ranked among the team's top four point earners during her three seasons in Kuortane. In the 2017–18 Naisten Liiga season, she led the team in points and goals during the regular season and topped the league's points table in the Aurora Borealis Cup playoffs. Buoyed by the sublime scoring production of Nylund, Nieminen, and Vainikka, Team Kuortane won the 2018 Finnish Championship bronze medal – the best postseason finish in team history.

She has played 83 regular season games in the Naisten SM-sarja/Naisten Liiga, scoring 43 goals and notching 36 assists. In the Aurora Borealis Cup playoffs, she has netted nine goals and seven assists in ten games.

Upon graduating from the Kuortaneen urheilulukio, Nylund opted to play college ice hockey in the United States and joined the St. Cloud State Huskies women's ice hockey program as a freshman for the 2018−2019 season. As of the conclusion of the 2020–21 season, she has scored 19 goals and 27 assists for 46 points in 84 games.

International play 
Nylund was a member of the Finnish national under-18 ice hockey team from 2013 to 2017. She played in the 2016 IIHF World Women's U18 Championships in St. Catharines, Ontario, at which Finland placed sixth. Despite the team's lower-than-desired finish, Nylund had a great tournament, notching two goals and four assists for six points in five games. Her point total ranked second on the Finnish team, behind Petra Nieminen (4+2), and tenth of all players participating in the tournament.

At the 2017 IIHF World Women's U18 Championship, Nylund again ranked second on the Finnish team in scoring, netting three goals in five games. The team roster featured many future senior national team players, including fellow 2021 World Championship debutants Sini Karjalainen, Julia Liikala, and Emilia Vesa. The team was talented and had quality depth, but an overtime loss to the Czech Republic in the group stage and a loss to Sweden in the quarterfinals limited them to a fifth-place finish.

Nylund first played with the senior Finnish national team in three matches during the 2016–17 international season, not recording a point. She continued to pursue the goal of being named to a World Championship roster while pursuing her college career in the United States, participating in the 2018 Four Nations Cup, at which Finland won bronze, and at two of the four tournaments in the 2019–20 Women's Euro Hockey Tour. Her goal was finally realized in April 2021, when she was named to the Finnish roster for the 2021 IIHF Women's World Championship.

Personal life 
Nylund is pursuing a bachelor’s degree in marketing at St. Cloud State University in St. Cloud, Minnesota.

Career statistics

Regular season and playoffs 

Sources: Elite Prospects, USCHO

International

References

External links 
 
 

Living people
1999 births
Finnish expatriate ice hockey players in the United States
Finnish ice hockey centres
Finnish women's ice hockey forwards
Ice hockey players at the 2022 Winter Olympics
Medalists at the 2022 Winter Olympics
Olympic ice hockey players of Finland
Olympic bronze medalists for Finland
Olympic medalists in ice hockey
People from Jakobstad
Sportspeople from Ostrobothnia (region)
St. Cloud State Huskies women's ice hockey players
Swedish-speaking Finns
Team Kuortane players